This is a list of feminist philosophers, that is, people who theorize about gender issues and female perspectives in different areas of philosophy.

A 
Carol Adams
Jane Addams
Linda Martín Alcoff
Alia Al-Saji
Amy Allen
Elizabeth Anderson
Pamela Sue Anderson
Gloria E. Anzaldúa
Hannah Arendt
Mary Astell

B 
Sandra Bartky
Nancy Bauer
Simone de Beauvoir
Seyla Benhabib
Peg Birmingham
Susan Bordo
Chiara Bottici
Rosi Braidotti
Samantha Brennan
Wendy Brown
Susan Brownmiller
Judith Butler

C 
Joan Callahan
Adriana Cavarero
Margaret Cavendish
Claudia Card
Ruth Chang
Nancy Chodorow
Hélène Cixous
Lorraine Code
Patricia Hill Collins
Drucilla Cornell
Alice Crary
Ann Cudd
Chris Cuomo
Jean Curthoys

D 
Mary Daly
Angela Y. Davis
Donna Dickenson
Penelope Deutscher
Andrea Dworkin

E 

Bracha Ettinger

F 
Anne Fausto-Sterling
Carla Fehr
Shulamith Firestone
Nancy Fraser
Miranda Fricker
Betty Friedan
Marilyn Friedman
Marilyn Frye

G 
Ann Garry
Ivone Gebara
Carol Gilligan
Kathryn Gines
Emma Goldman
Olympe de Gouges
Germaine Greer
Lisa Guenther

H 
Donna Haraway
Sandra Harding
Nancy Hartsock
Sally Haslanger
Virginia Held
Cressida Heyes
Nancy Holland
Bonnie Honig
Gillian Howie
bell hooks
Hypatia

I 

Luce Irigaray

J 
Alison Jaggar
Grace Jantzen

K 
Evelyn Fox Keller
Eva Feder Kittay
Sarah Kofman
Christine Koggel
Julia Kristeva

L 
Rae Helen Langton
Hilde Lindemann
Michèle Le Dœuff
Genevieve Lloyd
Helen Longino
Judith Lorber
Audre Lorde

M 
Catharine Macaulay
Catharine MacKinnon
Noëlle McAfee
Mary Kate McGowan
Peggy McIntosh
Diana Tietjens Meyers
Harriet Taylor Mill
Kate Millett
Trinh T. Minh-ha
Cherríe Moraga
Chantal Mouffe

N 

Uma Narayan
Kathryn Norlock
Martha Nussbaum
Andrea Nye
Noëlle McAfee

O 
Peg O'Connor
Susan Moller Okin
Kelly Oliver

P 
Carole Pateman
L.A. Paul
Nina Power
Paul B. Preciado

R 
Adrienne Rich
Avital Ronell
Hilary Rose

S 
Jennifer Saul
Naomi Scheman
Sally Scholz
Ofelia Schutte
Vandana Shiva
Dorothy Smith
Holly Martin Smith
Nancy Snow
Miriam Solomon
Elizabeth V. Spelman
Gayatri Chakravorty Spivak
Alison Stone
Shannon Sullivan
Anita Superson
Susanne Sreedhar

T 
Lisa Tessman
Lynne Tirrell
Sojourner Truth

W 
Margaret Urban Walker
Georgia Warnke
Anna Wheeler
Cynthia Willett
Charlotte Witt
Mary Wollstonecraft
Alison Wylie
Monique Wittig

Y 

 Young, Iris Marion
 Yu, Cheng-hsieh

Z 
Naomi Zack
Ewa Ziarek

References

 
Philosophers
Lists of philosophers